Qi Xuefei (born 28 February 1992) is a Chinese-born French badminton player. As a Nanjing native, Qi came to France to play a few Inter-club matches in Rostrenen in 2014. She married her physiotherapist in 2015, and decided to settle in Rostrenen. She obtained her French nationality in 2018, and at the same year, she entered the women's singles team in INSEP. Qi competed at the 2020 Tokyo Summer Olympics.

Achievements

BWF World Tour (1 runner-up) 
The BWF World Tour, which was announced on 19 March 2017 and implemented in 2018, is a series of elite badminton tournaments sanctioned by the Badminton World Federation (BWF). The BWF World Tours are divided into levels of World Tour Finals, Super 1000, Super 750, Super 500, Super 300 (part of the HSBC World Tour), and the BWF Tour Super 100.

Women's singles

BWF International Challenge/Series (6 titles, 2 runners-up) 
Women's singles

  BWF International Challenge tournament
  BWF International Series tournament
  BWF Future Series tournament

References

External links 
 

Living people
1992 births
Sportspeople from Nanjing
Badminton players from Jiangsu
Chinese female badminton players
French female badminton players
Chinese emigrants to France
Naturalized citizens of France
People who lost Chinese citizenship
Sportspeople from Côtes-d'Armor
Badminton players at the 2020 Summer Olympics
Olympic badminton players of France